
This is a list of players who graduated from the Nike Tour in 1993. The top ten players on the Nike Tour's money list in 1993 earned their PGA Tour card for 1994.

*PGA Tour rookie for 1994.

T = Tied
Green background indicates the player retained his PGA Tour card for 1995 (finished inside the top 125).
Yellow background indicates player did not retain his PGA Tour card for 1995, but retained conditional status (finished between 126–150).
Red background indicates the player did not retain his PGA Tour card for 1995 (finished outside the top 150).

See also
1993 PGA Tour Qualifying School graduates

References
Money list

Korn Ferry Tour
PGA Tour
Nike Tour graduates
Nike Tour graduates